This article presents a list of the historical events and publications of Australian literature during 1970.

Major publications

Books 
 Jessica Anderson – The Last Man's Head
 Jon Cleary – Helga's Web
 Geoffrey Dutton – Tamara
 Catherine Gaskin – Fiona
 Shirley Hazzard – The Bay of Noon
 Barry Oakley – A Salute to the Great Macarthy
 Dal Stivens – A Horse of Air
 Colin Thiele – Labourers in the Vineyard
 Patrick White – The Vivisector

Short stories 
 Murray Bail – "Paradise"
 Alexandra Hasluck – Of Ladies Dead : Stories Not in the Modern Manner
 Frank Moorhouse – "The Coca-Cola Kid"
 Hal Porter – Mr Butterfly and Other Tales of New Japan

Children's and Young Adult fiction 
 Hesba Brinsmead – Listen to the Wind
 Mavis Thorpe Clark – Iron Mountain
 Max Fatchen – Conquest of the River
 Lilith Norman – Climb a Lonely Hill
 Ruth Park
 The Muddle-Headed Wombat in the Springtime
 The Muddle-Headed Wombat on the River
 Joan Phipson – The Haunted House
 Ivan Southall
 Bread and Honey
 Chinaman's Reef is Ours

Science fiction and fantasy
 Damien Broderick – Sorcerer's World
 Michael Wilding – "The Man of Slow Feeling"

Poetry 

 Jack Davis – The First-Born and Other Poems
 Michael Dransfield – "Fix"
 Robert Gray – "Journey : The North Coast"
 Rodney Hall – Heaven, in a Way
 A. D. Hope – Dunciad Minor
 David Malouf – Bicycle and Other Poems
 Peter Porter – The Last of England
 David Rowbotham – The Makers of the Ark : Poems
 Kath Walker – My People : A Kath Walker Collection

Drama 
 David Williamson – The Coming of Stork

Non-fiction 
 Germaine Greer – The Female Eunuch

Awards and honours

Literary

Children and Young Adult

Poetry

Births 
A list, ordered by date of birth (and, if the date is either unspecified or repeated, ordered alphabetically by surname) of births in 1970 of Australian literary figures, authors of written works or literature-related individuals follows, including year of death.

 8 June – Paul Haines, short story writer (died 2012)

Unknown date
 Lee Battersby, novelist and short story writer
 Julia Leigh, novelist and script writer
 Martin Livings, short story writer
 Caroline Overington, novelist and journalist

Deaths 
A list, ordered by date of death (and, if the date is either unspecified or repeated, ordered alphabetically by surname) of deaths in 1970 of Australian literary figures, authors of written works or literature-related individuals follows, including year of birth.

 1 May – Nan Chauncy, writer for children (born 1900)
 24 May – Frank Dalby Davison, novelist and short story writer (born 1893)
 22 July – George Johnston, novelist (born 1912)
 30 July – Walter Murdoch, academic and essayist (born 1874)

See also 
 1970 in Australia
 1970 in literature
 1970 in poetry
 List of years in Australian literature
 List of years in literature

References

 
Australian literature by year
20th-century Australian literature
1970 in literature